Foot fetishism, also known as foot partialism or podophilia, is a pronounced sexual interest in feet. It is the most common form of sexual fetishism for otherwise non-sexual objects or body parts.

Characteristics and related fetishes
Foot fetishism has been defined as a pronounced sexual interest in feet. For a foot fetishist, points of attraction may include the shape and size of feet, feet soles, toes, jewelry (e.g., toe rings, anklets, etc.), treatments (such as massaging, washing partner's feet or painting partner's toenails), state of dress (e.g., barefoot, flip flops, ballet flats, sandals, high heels, hosiery, socked feet, etc.), foot odor or sensory interaction (e.g., rubbing the foot, smelling,  tickling, licking, rubbing genitals on foot, etc.).

Extensions of this fetish include shoes, socks, olfactophilia (odor fetishism) and tickling. Sigmund Freud also considered foot binding as a form of fetishism, although this view was disputed.

Odor fetishism (pertaining to the smell of feet) seems to play a major role in foot fetishism, and is closely related to it: in a 1994 study, 45% of those with a foot fetish were found to be aroused by smelly socks or feet, making it one of the most widespread forms of olfactophilia.

In extreme cases, an individual with a pronounced sexual interest in feet could possibly be diagnosed with fetishism disorder (characterized by the eroticization of non-living objects and body parts) if they are in adherence with the following symptoms:' Experiencing recurrent sexually arousing fantasies, urges, or behaviors involving the use of non-living objects over a period of at least six months.
 These fantasies, urges or behaviors cause significant distress in a social, occupational or personal environment.
 The fetish objects are not limited to  articles of clothing  or devices used for genital stimulation.

Relative frequency
To estimate the relative frequency of fetishes, in 2006 researchers at the University of Bologna examined 381 Internet discussions of fetish groups, in which at least 5,000 people had been participating. Researchers estimated the prevalence of different fetishes based on the following elements:

 (a) the number of discussion groups devoted to a particular fetish;
 (b) the number of individuals participating in the groups;
 (c) the number of messages exchanged.

It was concluded that the most common fetishes were for body parts or for objects usually associated with body parts (33% and 30%, respectively). Among those people preferring body parts, feet and toes were preferred by the greatest number, with 47% of those sampled preferring them. Among those people preferring objects related to body parts, 32% were in groups related to footwear (shoes, boots, etc.).

Foot fetishism is the most common form of sexual fetish related to the body.

In August 2006, AOL released a database of the search terms submitted by their subscribers. In ranking only those phrases that included the word "fetish", it was found that the most common search was for feet.

Foot fetishism may be more common in men than in women. Researchers using a polling agency to conduct a survey of the general Belgian population in 2017 found that of 1027 respondents, 76 of the men (17%) and 23 of the women (4%) answered "Agree" or "Strongly agree" to a fetish interest in feet.

Causes
Similar to other forms of sexual fetishism, no consensus has yet been established about the specific causes of foot fetishism. While many works on the topic exist, their conclusions are often regarded as highly speculative. In a general sense, sexual fetishism can be caused by a number of factors, no singular cause for any type of fetishism has been conclusively established.  

The cortical homunculus (also known as Penfield's Homunculus), a map of the human brain illustrating respective locations for where different parts of the body are processed, shows a possible link between the feet and toes to the genitalia. There exists controversy regarding this neural crosslink, as some medical professionals have been known to question the simplicity of the map in comparison to reality.

Foot fetishism may be caused by the feet and the genitals occupying adjacent areas of the somatosensory cortex, possibly entailing some neural crosstalk between the two. Neuroscientist V. S. Ramachandran proposed that an accidental link between these regions could explain the prevalence of foot fetishism.

Desmond Morris considered foot fetishism the result of mal-imprinting at an early age, the tactile pressure of a foot/shoe being important in this. Freud's reading of foot fetishism also involved early imprinting, but he considered the smell of feet significant in this, as well as the foot as a penis-symbol/surrogate (castration complex, especially when encountered while voyeuristically exploring the female body from below).  Otto Fenichel similarly saw castration fear as significant in foot fetishism, citing a future fetishist who as an adolescent said to himself "You must remember this throughout life – that girls, too, have legs", to protect himself from the fear. Where fear of the (castrated) female body is too great, desire is felt not for shoes on female feet but for women's shoes alone, without women.

Georges Bataille saw the lure of the feet as linked to their anatomical baseness (abjection).

Health and disease
Some researchers have hypothesized that foot fetishism increases as a response to epidemics of sexually transmitted diseases. In one study, conducted by Dr. A James Giannini at Ohio State University, an increased interest in feet as sexual objects was observed during the great gonorrhea epidemic of twelfth-century Europe, and the syphilis epidemics of the 16th and 19th centuries in Europe. In the same study, the frequency of foot-fetish depictions in pornographic literature was measured over a 30-year interval. An exponential increase was noted during the period of the current AIDS epidemic. In these cases, sexual footplay was viewed as a safe sex alternative. However, the researchers noted that these epidemics overlapped periods of relative female emancipation.

Society and culture
Some of the earliest recorded instances of foot fetishism occur in the erotic poems To a Barefoot Woman and To a Barefoot Boy attributed to the Ancient Greek writer Philostratus.Levin, Daniel B. (2005) EPATON BAMA ('Her Lovely Footstep'): The Erotics of Feet in Ancient Greece. The Hindu god Shiva was aroused by the sight of Parvati's feet in the eight-century text Skanda Purana. Another reference to the fetish is made by Bertold of Regensburg in 1220. F. Scott Fitzgerald was described by a mistress as a foot fetishist, and himself referred to a "Freudian shame about his feet". 

Actor Idris Elba has confirmed in interviews since 2013 that he has a foot fetish, for example in 2016 telling UK Esquire "I've got a foot fetish. Women's feet.", and answering in the affirmative to the question while connected to a polygraph for Vanity Fair in 2019. Other contemporary celebrities who have told interviewers, "I have a foot fetish" (or a slight variation thereof) include Brooke Burke, Enrique Iglesias, Tommy Lee, Ludacris, Ricky Martin, and Todd Phillips.

In 2020 an artist collective released This Foot Does Not Exist, a project that uses generative adversarial networks to generate new "foot pics" by text message request.

See also

 Boot fetishism
 Body odour and sexual attraction
 Boot worship
 Crush fetish
 Foot odor
 Footjob
 Partialism
 Shoe fetishism

References

Further reading
Havelock Ellis (1936), Studies in the Psychology of Sex, Vol. II, New York: Random House
William Rossi (1989), The Sex Life of the Foot and Shoe'', Malabar: Krieger Publishing Company.

External links

 
Foot
Paraphilias
Sexual fetishism